Forry House is a historic home located at York, York County, Pennsylvania. Built in 1809 by Rudolph Forry, it is a -story, limestone dwelling with a gable roof and two gable end brick chimneys.

It was added to the National Register of Historic Places in 1977.

References

Houses on the National Register of Historic Places in Pennsylvania
Houses completed in 1809
Houses in York County, Pennsylvania
Buildings and structures in York, Pennsylvania
National Register of Historic Places in York County, Pennsylvania